Every Disabled Child Matters (EDCM) is a political campaign  based in England with the aim of improving rights for disabled children and their families. The stated campaign objectives focus on issues such as poverty, education, access to government services and inclusion. The campaign was launched in September 2006.

Running and strategy 
The campaign is run jointly by four organisations:
 Contact a Family
 Council for Disabled Children ( part of National Children's Bureau )
 Mencap
 Special Education Consortium (part of National Children's Bureau )
The strategy for the campaign is set by an executive team drawn from these four organisations.

References 

Disability rights organizations
Disability organisations based in England
Politics of England
Political campaigns in the United Kingdom
Poverty in England
Education in England
Governance of England